The 1927 Victorian state election was held on 9 April 1927.

Seat changes
Abbotsford Labor MLA Gordon Webber contested Heidelberg.
Ballarat East Labor MLA William McAdam contested Ballarat.
Ballarat West Nationalist MLA Matthew Baird contested Ballarat.
Bendigo West Labor MLA Arthur Cook contested Bendigo.
Boroondara Nationalist MLA Edmund Greenwood contested Nunawading.
Bulla Labor MLA Ralph Hjorth contested Grant.
Castlemaine and Maldon Nationalist MLA Harry Lawson contested Castlemaine and Kyneton.
Dalhousie Labor MLA Reg Pollard contested Bulla and Dalhousie.
Daylesford Labor MLA James McDonald contested Mildura.
Eaglehawk Country Progressive MLA Albert Dunstan contested Eaglehawk.
East Melbourne Nationalist MLA Alfred Farthing contested Caulfield.
Essendon Labor MLA Frank Keane contested Coburg.
Fitzroy Labor MLA Maurice Blackburn contested Clifton Hill.
Glenelg Labor MLA Ernie Bond contested Port Fairy and Glenelg.
Grenville Labor MLA Arthur Hughes contested Hampden.
Jika Jika Labor MLA John Cain contested Northcote.
Kara Kara Nationalist MLA John Pennington contested Kara Kara and Borung.
Korong Country MLA Isaac Weaver contested Korong and Eaglehawk.
Maryborough Labor MLA George Frost contested Maryborough and Daylesford.
North Melbourne Labor MLA George Prendergast contested Footscray.
Port Fairy Labor MLA Henry Bailey contested Warrnambool.
Wangaratta Country MLA Sir John Bowser contested Wangaratta and Ovens.
Warrenheip Labor MLA Edmond Hogan contested Warrenheip and Grenville.

Retiring Members
Note: Warrnambool Nationalist MLA James Deany died a month before the election; no by-election was held due to the proximity of the general election.

Labor
Luke Clough MLA (Bendigo East)

Nationalist
Alfred Billson MLA (Ovens)
John Gordon MLA (Waranga)

Country
David Allison MLA (Borung)

Legislative Assembly
Sitting members are shown in bold text. Successful candidates are highlighted in the relevant colour. Where there is possible confusion, an asterisk (*) is also used.

See also
1928 Victorian Legislative Council election

References

Psephos - Adam Carr's Election Archive

Victoria
Candidates for Victorian state elections